Nicole Chan was a Vancouver Police Department officer who took her own life in 2019. Chan made allegations of being the victim of sexual coercion from supervising officers prior to her death.

Background 
In late 2018, Chan filed a claim with the British Columbia statutory body WorkSafeBC that alleged she was a victim of sexual coercion from two supervising officers in 2017. She was on stress leave from work for three weeks prior to her death.

Death 
Chan died by suicidal strangulation on the morning of January 27, 2019. She had been released from Vancouver General Hospital the subsequent evening after being taken to hospital under British Columbia's Mental Health Act, after threatening suicide. Her body was discovered by her boyfriend in her apartment.

Aftermath 
After a 2019 police investigation, one of her supervising officers was dismissed by the police force for discreditable conduct; the police force did not hold a public hearing into the dismissal. Her family launched litigation against the police force, Chan's supervisor and the City of Vancouver in January 2022.

During the 2023 British Columbia coroners inquest into her death, the legal representative of the Chan family shared the allegations of sexual coercion. At the end of the coroner's inquest, the jury recommended "better communication between community health care providers, police and paramedics and the hospital physician treating a patient with a mental health emergency", as well as improvements to Vancouver Police training.

See also 

 Police officer safety and health
 List of suicides attributed to bullying
 List of suicides in the 21st century

References 

2019 suicides
2019 in British Columbia
Suicide articles
January 2019 events in Canada
Deaths by strangulation